Henryk Józef Smolarz (born 3 September 1969 in Lublin) is a Polish politician who was the President of the Agricultural Social Insurance Fund. He was first elected to the Sejm on 25 September 2005, getting 4534 votes in 6 Lublin district as a candidate from the Polish People's Party list.

See also
Members of Polish Sejm 2005-2007

External links
Henryk Smolarz - parliamentary page - includes declarations of interest, voting record, and transcripts of speeches.

Members of the Polish Sejm 2005–2007
Polish People's Party politicians
1969 births
Living people
Members of the Polish Sejm 2011–2015